Coptodon ejagham is a species of fish in the cichlid family. It is endemic to Lake Ejagham in western Cameroon. It was only scientifically described in 2010 and has therefore not been rated by the IUCN, but it likely faces the same risks as the critically endangered C. deckerti, which is threatened by pollution and sedimentation from human activities, a catfish from the genus Parauchenoglanis that has been introduced to the lake, and potentially also by large emissions of carbon dioxide (CO2) from the lake's bottom (compare Lake Nyos), although Ejagham is too shallow to contain very high amounts of this gas.

It feeds on small fish, especially juvenile cichlids.

References

ejagham
Fish of Cameroon
Endemic fauna of Cameroon
Lake fish of Africa
Fish described in 2010
Taxobox binomials not recognized by IUCN